"Spiders" is a song by American electronica musician Moby. It was released as the third single from his seventh studio album Hotel on May 30, 2005 in the United Kingdom. It served as the second single from the album in the United Kingdom, where it was released in place of "Raining Again".

"Spiders" is inspired by Moby's admiration for David Bowie. As such, it could be a reference to the Spiders from Mars, Bowie's touring band during the Ziggy Stardust era.

Track listing 
 CD single 
 "Spiders"  – 3:40
 "It's OK" – 3:51
 CD single 
 "Spiders"  – 3:46
 "Put the Headphones On" – 3:50
 "Raining Again"  – 7:09
 Limited edition 7-inch single 
 "Spiders" – 3:42
 "Temptation" – 4:52

Charts

References

External links
 

Moby songs
2005 songs
2005 singles
Songs written by Moby
Mute Records singles